The Laus Pisonis (Praise of Piso) is a Latin verse panegyric of the 1st century AD in praise of a man of the Piso family. The exact identity of the subject is not completely certain, but current scholarly consensus identifies him with Gaius Calpurnius Piso, the leader of a conspiracy against Nero in AD 65. The Latinity is straightforward; the subject is praised for his oratorical ability as an advocate in law cases, for the kindness with which he maintains his house open to poor men of talent, but also for his skill at playing ball and especially the board game of latrunculi, for which the poem is one of our main sources.

About the author of the work there is considerably more doubt; it has been attributed to Ovid, Saleius Bassus and Statius before an analysis of the text made it clear that the first lived too early and the others too late to write it; Lucan and Calpurnius Siculus are the leading contenders today. Whoever he was, the author says in the concluding verses of his poem that he was not yet twenty years old.

The work, comprising 261 dactylic hexameters, has come down via a single manuscript once preserved in the monastery of Lorsch, and now lost; although sizable portions were also preserved in several medieval florilegia, the manuscripts of which are still extant. The editio princeps is in J. Sichard's edition of Ovid, Basel, 1527, and the work has seen about a dozen editions over the centuries, having drawn the attention of Joseph Scaliger and Emil Baehrens among others. A restoration of the archetype of the florilegia was published by Berthold Ullman.

References

External links
Laus Pisonis: Latin text with summary apparatus, English translation and introduction at LacusCurtius, a transcription of the edition by J. Wight Duff and Arnold Duff (Loeb Classical Library, Carmina Minora, Vol. I), in which the Latin text is that of Baehrens with minor changes.

Laus Pisonis